Dimitar Petrov (born 8 October 1958) is a Bulgarian rower. He competed in the men's double sculls event at the 1980 Summer Olympics.

References

1958 births
Living people
Bulgarian male rowers
Olympic rowers of Bulgaria
Rowers at the 1980 Summer Olympics
Place of birth missing (living people)